The Agusta GA.70 was a four-cylinder, air-cooled, horizontally opposed engine developed in Italy for light aircraft and helicopter use. It was produced in the 1950s and 1960s.

Variants
GA.70/0Horizontal mounting for light aircraft.
GA.70/VVertical mounting for helicopters.

Applications
 Agusta A.103
 Bölkow Bo 103
 de Bernardi M.d.B. 02 Aeroscooter
 Phoenix Minor
 Phoenix Major

Specifications (GA.70)

Notes

References

 Erickson, Jack. Horizontally-Opposed Piston Aero Engines

1950s aircraft piston engines
Boxer engines
Agusta aircraft engines